HMS Thetis was a 46-gun  fifth-rate frigate built for the Royal Navy during the 1810s. She was first commissioned in 1823 and was assigned to the South America Station three years later. The ship was wrecked in 1830 off Cape Frio, Brazil, with the loss of 22 crewmen; most of her cargo of bullion was successfully salvaged.

Description
The ship's tonnage was 1086  tons burthen. Thetis was armed with twenty-eight 18-pounder cannon on her gundeck, fourteen 32-pounder carronades on her quarterdeck and a pair of 9-pounder cannon and two more 32-pounder carronades in forecastle. The ship had a crew of 315 officers and ratings.

Construction and career

Thetis, the eighth ship of her name to serve in the Royal Navy, was ordered on 18 December 1812, laid down in December 1814 at Pembroke Dockyard, Wales, and launched on 1 February 1813. She sailed for Plymouth Dockyard on 21 August 1817 and was completed for ordinary on 20 September. Thetis cost £27,435 to build and £7,699 to fit out for ordinary. The ship's first commission began on 15 March 1823, under the command of Captain John Phillimore, and she was completed for sea duty on 20 August 1823 at the cost of an additional £12,959. Soon after this Thetis was used in an experiment reducing the onboard rum ration, for which the ship received the nickname "Tea Chest".

Thetis was assigned to the South America Station in June 1826 and Captain Arthur Bingham assumed command on 8 November. He died on 19 August 1830 and Captain Samuel Burgess was in command by 29 November. On 5 December Thetis, the ship was wrecked off Cape Frio, Brazil; 22 crewmen drowned. Two-thirds of her cargo of bullion was subsequently salvaged. In August 1832 the Falmouth packet  brought back to England 17,000 dollars salvaged from Thetis.

Notes

References

Hepper, David J. (1994) British Warship Losses in the Age of Sail, 1650–1859. (Rotherfield: Jean Boudriot). 

 

Leda-class frigates
1817 ships
Ships built in Pembroke Dock
Maritime incidents in December 1830